John Francis Shannon  (December 3, 1873 – February 27, 1934) was a Major League Baseball shortstop. He played in one game for the Washington Senators of the National League on October 1, 1892 and later played in 31 games for the Louisville Colonels in 1896. His minor league career stretched from 1893 to 1910, mostly in the New England League or the Eastern League.

References

External links

1873 births
1934 deaths
19th-century baseball players
Major League Baseball shortstops
Louisville Colonels players
Washington Senators (1891–1899) players
Augusta Tourists players
Brockton Shoemakers players
Brockton Tigers players
Bowdoin Polar Bears baseball coaches
Buffalo Bisons (minor league) players
Haverhill Hustlers players
Indianapolis Hoosiers (minor league) players
Kansas City Blue Stockings players
Lowell Tigers players
Lynn Shoemakers players
Montreal Royals players
New Bedford Whalers (baseball) players
Providence Grays (minor league) players
Rochester Brownies players
Springfield Maroons players
Springfield Ponies players
Worcester Quakers players
Baseball players from San Francisco